John Ambrose Weldon (November 7, 1895 – May 25, 1928) was a professional football player during the 1920s. He played in the American Professional Football Association (renamed the National Football League in 1922) for the Buffalo All-Americans. Weldon was instrumental in the first NFL game to take place in New York City, as Buffalo defeated the Canton Bulldogs 7-3 at the Polo Grounds. During the game Weldon punted against the legendary Jim Thorpe and kicked a point after touchdown.

However Weldon also played independent football for the Phoenix Athletic Club in 1919 and Union Club of Phoenixville in 1921. He would play a non-league game with Phoenixville on Saturdays, then took a train to Buffalo and the next day's game. This arrangement helped Weldon, and several other Buffalo All-Americans players, earn extra money in between league games.

Prior to playing pro football, Weldon played at the college level for Lafayette College. He received a college letter in 1916 and was named the team's captain in 1917. While at Lafayette, he also played on the school's basketball team, as a guard, and on the baseball team as an outfielder.

References

Ghosts of the Gridiron, which tracks the Football history of the Union Club of Phoenixville

1895 births
1928 deaths
Union Club of Phoenixville players
Buffalo All-Americans players
Lafayette Leopards football players